Wilhelm "Willi" Egger (7 October 1932 – 29 April 2008) was an Austrian Nordic combined skier and ski jumper who competed from the late 1950s to the mid-1960s.

Born in Murau, he won three events as a ski jumper in the Four Hills Tournament with wins each in Garmisch-Partenkirchen (1957–58), Innsbruck (1961–62), and Bischofshofen (1961–62). Egger also competed in two Winter Olympics, earning his best finish of 12th in the individual large hill event at Innsbruck in 1964.

Egger also finished 16th in the Nordic combined event at the 1956 Winter Olympics in Cortina d'Ampezzo.

References
 
 Willi Egger's profile at Sports Reference.com

1932 births
2008 deaths
People from Murau
Austrian male Nordic combined skiers
Austrian male ski jumpers
Nordic combined skiers at the 1956 Winter Olympics
Olympic Nordic combined skiers of Austria
Olympic ski jumpers of Austria
Ski jumpers at the 1960 Winter Olympics
Ski jumpers at the 1964 Winter Olympics
Sportspeople from Styria
20th-century Austrian people